Nossa Senhora da Conceição is a freguesia (civil parish) of Cape Verde. It covers the southern part of the municipality of São Filipe, on the island of Fogo. The freguesia consists of the following settlements:

Settlements
The freguesia consists of the following settlements, its population data was of the 2010 census:

Brandão (pop: 198)
Cabeça do Monte (pop: 282)
Curral Ochô (pop: 210)
Cutelo (pop: 126)
Forno (pop: 323)
Jardim (pop: 322)
Lacacã (pop: 153)
Lagariça (pop: 407)
Luzia Nunes (pop: 438)
Miguel Gonçalves (pop: 119)
Monte Grande (pop: 743)
Monte Largo (pop: 274)
Patim (pop: 876, town)
Salto (pop: 116)
São Filipe (pop: 8,122, city)
Tongom (pop: 367)
Vicente Dias (pop: 242)

References

Geography of Fogo, Cape Verde
Parishes of Cape Verde
São Filipe, Cape Verde